The Wall is the eleventh studio album by the English progressive rock band Pink Floyd, released on 30 November 1979 by Harvest/EMI and Columbia/CBS Records. It is a rock opera that explores Pink, a jaded rock star whose eventual self-imposed isolation from society forms a figurative wall. The album was a commercial success, topping the US charts for 15 weeks and reaching number three in the UK. It initially received mixed reviews from critics, many of whom found it overblown and pretentious, but later received accolades as one of the greatest albums of all time and one of the band's finest works.

Bassist Roger Waters conceived The Wall during Pink Floyd's 1977 In the Flesh tour, modelling the character of Pink after himself and Pink Floyd's former songwriter Syd Barrett. Recording spanned from December 1978 to November 1979. Producer Bob Ezrin helped to refine the concept and bridge tensions during recording, as the band members were struggling with personal and financial issues at the time. The Wall was the last album to feature Pink Floyd as a quartet; keyboardist Richard Wright was fired by Waters during production but stayed on as a salaried musician.

Three singles were issued from the album: "Another Brick in the Wall, Part 2" (Pink Floyd's only UK and US number-one single), "Run Like Hell", and "Comfortably Numb". From 1980 to 1981, Pink Floyd performed the full album on a tour that featured elaborate theatrical effects. In 1982, The Wall was adapted into a feature film for which Waters wrote the screenplay.

The Wall is one of the best-known concept albums. With over 30 million copies sold, it is the second best-selling album in the band's catalogue (behind The Dark Side of the Moon), the best selling double-album of all time, and one of the best-selling albums of all time overall. Some of the outtakes from the recording sessions were used on the group's next album, The Final Cut (1983). In 2000, it was voted number 30 in Colin Larkin's All Time Top 1000 Albums. In 2003, 2012, and 2020, it was included in Rolling Stones lists of the greatest albums of all time. From 2010 to 2013, Waters staged a new Wall live tour that became the highest-grossing tour by a solo musician.

Background 

In 1977, Pink Floyd played the In the Flesh tour. Bassist and singer-songwriter Roger Waters despised the experience, feeling the audience was not listening and that many were too far away to see the band. He said: "It became a social event rather than a more controlled and ordinary relationship between musicians and an audience." Some audience members set off firecrackers, leading Waters to stop playing and scold them. In July 1977, on the final date at the Montreal Olympic Stadium, a group of noisy and excited fans near the stage irritated Waters so much that he spat on one of them.

Guitarist and singer-songwriter David Gilmour refused to perform a final encore and sat at the soundboard, leaving the band, with backup guitarist Snowy White, to improvise a slow, sad 12-bar blues, which Waters announced to the audience as "some music to go home to". That night, Waters spoke with producer Bob Ezrin and Ezrin's psychiatrist friend about the alienation and despair he was experiencing. He articulated his desire to isolate himself by constructing a wall across the stage between the band and the audience.

While Gilmour and Wright were in France recording solo albums, and drummer Nick Mason was busy producing Steve Hillage's Green, Waters began to write material. The spitting incident became the starting point for a new concept, which explored the protagonist's self-imposed isolation after years of traumatic interactions with authority figures and the loss of his father as a child.

In July 1978, Pink Floyd reconvened at Britannia Row Studios, where Waters presented two new ideas for concept albums. The first was a 90-minute demo with the working title Bricks in the Wall. The second was about a man's dreams across one night, and dealt with marriage, sex, and the pros and cons of monogamy and family life versus promiscuity. The band chose the first option; the second eventually became Waters's first solo album, The Pros and Cons of Hitch Hiking (1984).

By September, Pink Floyd were having financial problems and urgently needed to produce an album to make money. The financial planners Norton Warburg Group (NWG) had invested £1.3–3.3 million, up to £ in contemporary value, of the group's money in high-risk venture capital to reduce their tax liabilities. The strategy failed when many of the businesses NWG invested in lost money, leaving the band facing tax rates potentially as high as 83 percent. Waters said: "Eighty-three per cent was a lot of money in those days and we didn't have it." Pink Floyd terminated their relationship with NWG, demanding the return of uninvested funds. Gilmour said he became closely involved in the business side of Pink Floyd afterwards: "Ever since then, there's not a penny that I haven't signed for. I sign every cheque and examine everything."

To help manage the project's 26 tracks, Waters decided to bring in an outside producer and collaborator, feeling he needed "a collaborator who was musically and intellectually in a similar place to where I was". They hired Ezrin at the suggestion of Waters's then-wife Carolyne Christie, who had worked as Ezrin's secretary. Ezrin had previously worked with Alice Cooper, Lou Reed, Kiss, and Peter Gabriel. From the start, Waters made it clear who was in charge, telling him: "You can write anything you want. Just don't expect any credit."

Ezrin and Gilmour reviewed Waters's concept, discarding what they thought was not good enough. Waters and Ezrin worked mostly on the story, improving the concept. Ezrin presented a 40-page script to the rest of the band, with positive results. He recalled: "The next day at the studio, we had a table read, like you would with a play, but with the whole of the band, and their eyes all twinkled, because then they could see the album." Ezrin broadened the storyline, distancing it from the autobiographical work Waters had written and basing it on a composite character named Pink. Engineer Nick Griffiths later said: "Ezrin was very good in The Wall, because he did manage to pull the whole thing together. He's a very forceful guy. There was a lot of argument about how it should sound between Roger and Dave, and he bridged the gap between them." Waters wrote most of the album, with Gilmour co-writing "Comfortably Numb", "Run Like Hell", and "Young Lust", and Ezrin co-writing "The Trial".

Concept and storyline 

The Wall is a rock opera that explores abandonment and isolation, symbolized by a wall. The songs create a storyline of events in the life of Pink, a character based on Waters and Pink Floyd's former frontman Syd Barrett. The album includes several references to Barrett, including "Nobody Home", which hints at his condition during Pink Floyd's abortive US tour of 1967, with lyrics such as "wild, staring eyes", "the obligatory Hendrix perm" and "elastic bands keeping my shoes on". "Comfortably Numb" was inspired by Waters' injection with a muscle relaxant to combat the effects of hepatitis during the In the Flesh tour in Philadelphia.

Plot 
Pink is a depressed rock star. He imagines a crowd of fans entering one of his concerts, and a flashback on his life up to that point begins. In the flashback, it is revealed that his father was killed defending the Anzio bridgehead during World War II ("In the Flesh?", "When the Tigers Broke Free" (movie only)). Pink's mother raises him alone ("The Thin Ice"), and with the death of his father, Pink starts to build a metaphorical wall around himself ("Another Brick in the Wall, Part 1"). Growing older, Pink is tormented at school by tyrannical, abusive teachers ("The Happiest Days of Our Lives"), and memories of these traumas become metaphorical "bricks in the wall" ("Another Brick in the Wall, Part 2").

Now an adult, Pink remembers his oppressive and overprotective mother ("Mother") and his upbringing during the Blitz ("Goodbye Blue Sky"). Pink soon marries, and after more bricks are created through more trauma, he is preparing to complete his "wall" ("Empty Spaces"). While touring in the United States, he seeks casual sex with a woman to relieve the tedium of touring, though in making a phone call home, he learns of his wife's infidelity ("Young Lust"). He brings a groupie back to his hotel room, only to trash it in a violent fit of rage, terrifying her out of the room ("One of My Turns"). Depressed, Pink thinks about his wife, and feels trapped in his room ("Don't Leave Me Now"), and he dismisses every traumatic experience he has ever had as even more "bricks" in the metaphorical wall while rejecting human contact and medication ("Another Brick in the Wall, Part 3"). Pink's wall is now finished, completely isolating himself from the outside world ("Goodbye Cruel World").

Immediately after the wall's completion, Pink questions his decisions ("Hey You") and locks himself in his hotel room ("Is There Anybody Out There?"). Beginning to feel depressed, Pink turns to his possessions for comfort ("Nobody Home"), and yearns for the idea of reconnecting with his personal roots ("Vera"). Pink's mind flashes back to World War II, with the people demanding that the soldiers return home ("Bring the Boys Back Home"). Returning to the present, Pink's manager and roadies have busted into his hotel room, where they find him unresponsive. A paramedic injects him with drugs to enable him to perform ("Comfortably Numb").

The drugs kick in, resulting in a hallucinatory on-stage performance ("The Show Must Go On") where he believes that he is a fascist dictator, and that his concert is a Neo-Nazi rally, at which he sets brownshirt-like men on fans that he considers unworthy ("In the Flesh"). He proceeds to attack ethnic minorities ("Run Like Hell"), and then holds a rally in suburban London, symbolising his descent into insanity ("Waiting for the Worms"). Pink's hallucination then ceases, and he begs for everything to stop ("Stop"). Tormented with guilt, Pink places himself on trial for "showing feelings of an almost human nature" before his inner judge orders him to "tear down the wall" ("The Trial"). This is the opening of Pink to the outside world ("Outside the Wall").

The album turns full circle with its closing words "Isn't this where...", the first words of the phrase that begins the album, "...we came in?", with a continuation of the melody of the last song hinting at the cyclical nature of Waters' theme, and that the existential crisis at the heart of the album will never truly end.

Production

Recording 
The Wall was recorded in several locations. In France, Super Bear Studios was used between January and July 1979, and Waters recorded his vocals at the nearby Studio Miraval. Michael Kamen supervised the orchestral arrangements at CBS Studios in New York, in September. Over the next two months the band used Cherokee Studios, Producers Workshop and The Village Recorder in Los Angeles. A plan to work with the Beach Boys at the Sundance Productions studio in Los Angeles was cancelled.

James Guthrie, recommended by previous Floyd collaborator Alan Parsons, arrived early in the production process. He replaced engineer Brian Humphries, who was emotionally drained by his five years with the band. Guthrie was hired as a co-producer, but was initially unaware of Ezrin's role: "I saw myself as a hot young producer ... When we arrived, I think we both felt we'd been booked to do the same job." The early sessions at Britannia Row were emotionally charged, as Ezrin, Guthrie and Waters each had strong ideas about the direction the album would take. Relations within the band were at a low ebb, and Ezrin became an intermediary between Waters and the rest of the band.

As Britannia Row was initially regarded as inadequate for The Wall, the band upgraded much of its equipment, and by March another set of demos was complete. However, their former relationship with NWG placed them at risk of bankruptcy, and they were advised to leave the UK by no later than 6 April 1979, for a minimum of one year. As non-residents they would pay no UK taxes during that time, and within a month all four members and their families had left. Waters moved to Switzerland, Mason to France, and Gilmour and Wright to the Greek Islands. Some equipment from Britannia Row was relocated in Super Bear Studios near Nice. Gilmour and Wright were both familiar with the studio and enjoyed its atmosphere, having recorded solo albums there. While Wright and Mason lived at the studio, Waters and Gilmour stayed in nearby houses. Mason later moved into Waters's villa near Vence, while Ezrin stayed in Nice.

Ezrin's poor punctuality caused problems with the tight schedule dictated by Waters. Mason found Ezrin's behaviour "erratic", but used his elaborate and unlikely excuses for his lateness as ammunition for "tongue-in-cheek resentment". Ezrin's share of the royalties was less than the rest of the band and he viewed Waters as a bully, especially when Waters mocked him by having badges made that read NOPE (No Points Ezrin), alluding to his lesser share. Ezrin later said he had had marital problems and was not "in the best shape emotionally".

More problems became apparent when Waters's relationship with Wright broke down. The band were rarely in the studio together. Ezrin and Guthrie spliced Mason's previously recorded drum tracks together, and Guthrie worked with Waters and Gilmour during the day, returning at night to record Wright's contributions. Wright, worried about the effect that the introduction of Ezrin would have on band relationships, was keen to have a producer's credit on the album; their albums since More (1969) had credited production to "Pink Floyd". Waters agreed to a trial period with Wright producing, after which he was to be given a producer's credit, but after a few weeks he and Ezrin expressed dissatisfaction with Wright's methods. A confrontation with Ezrin led to Wright working only at nights. Gilmour also expressed his annoyance, complaining that Wright's lack of input was "driving us all mad". Ezrin later reflected: "it sometimes felt that Roger was setting him up to fail. Rick gets performance anxiety. You have to leave him alone to freeform, to create ..."

Wright was troubled by a failing marriage and the onset of depression, exacerbated by his non-residency. While the other band members brought their children, Wright's children were older and could not join as they were attending school; he said he missed them "terribly". The band's holidays were booked for August, after which they were to reconvene at Cherokee Studios in Los Angeles, but Columbia offered the band a better deal in exchange for a Christmas release of the album. Waters increased the band's workload accordingly, booking time at the nearby Studio Miraval. He also suggested recording in Los Angeles ten days earlier than agreed, and hiring another keyboardist to work alongside Wright, whose keyboard parts had not yet been recorded. Wright, however, refused to cut short his family holiday in Rhodes.

Accounts of Wright's subsequent departure from the band differ. In his autobiography, Inside Out, Mason says that Waters called the band's manager, Steve O'Rourke, who was travelling to the US on the QE2, and told him to have Wright out of the band by the time Waters arrived in LA to mix the album. In another version recorded by a later historian of the band, Waters called O'Rourke and asked him to tell Wright about the new recording arrangements, to which Wright responded: "Tell Roger to fuck off". Wright denied this, stating that the band had agreed to record only through the spring and early summer, and that he had no idea they were so far behind schedule. Mason later wrote that Waters was "stunned and furious", and felt that Wright was not doing enough. Gilmour was on holiday in Dublin when he learnt of Waters's ultimatum, and tried to calm the situation. He later spoke with Wright and gave him his support, but reminded him about his minimal contributions. Waters, however, insisted that Wright leave, or he would refuse to release The Wall. Several days later, worried about their financial situation and the failing interpersonal relationships within the band, Wright quit. News of his departure was kept from the music press. Although his name did not appear on some editions of the album (it does appear on the U.K. gatefold sleeve), he was employed as a session musician on the band's subsequent tour.

By August 1979, the running order was largely complete. Wright completed his duties at Cherokee Studios aided by session musicians Peter Wood and Fred Mandel, and Jeff Porcaro played drums in Mason's stead on "Mother". Mason left the final mix to Waters, Gilmour, Ezrin and Guthrie, and travelled to New York to record his debut solo album, Nick Mason's Fictitious Sports. In advance of its release, technical constraints led to some changes to the running order and content of The Wall, with "What Shall We Do Now?" replaced by the similar but shorter "Empty Spaces", and "Hey You" being moved from the end of side three to the beginning. With the November 1979 deadline approaching, the band left the inner sleeves of the album unchanged.

Instrumentation 

Mason's early drum sessions were performed in an open space on the top floor of Britannia Row Studios. The 16-track recordings from these sessions were mixed down and copied onto a 24-track master, as guide tracks for the rest of the band to play to. This gave the engineers greater flexibility, but also improved the audio quality of the mix, as the original 16-track drum recordings were synced to the 24-track master and the duplicated guide tracks removed. Ezrin later related the band's alarm at this method of working – they apparently viewed the erasure of material from the 24-track master as "witchcraft".

While at Super Bear studios, Waters agreed to Ezrin's suggestion that several tracks, including "Nobody Home", "The Trial" and "Comfortably Numb", should have an orchestral accompaniment. Michael Kamen, who had previously worked with David Bowie, was booked to oversee these arrangements, which were performed by musicians from the New York Philharmonic and New York Symphony Orchestras, and a choir from the New York City Opera. Their sessions were recorded at CBS Studios in New York without Pink Floyd present. Kamen eventually met the band once recording was complete.

"Comfortably Numb" has its origins in Gilmour's debut solo album, and was the source of much argument between Waters and Gilmour. Ezrin claimed that the song initially started life as "Roger's record, about Roger, for Roger", but he thought that it needed further work. Waters changed the key of the verse and added more lyrics to the chorus, and Gilmour added extra bars for the line "I have become comfortably numb". Gilmour's "stripped-down and harder" recording was not to Waters's liking; Waters preferred Ezrin's "grander Technicolor, orchestral version". Following a major argument in a North Hollywood restaurant, the two compromised; the song's body included the orchestral arrangement, with Gilmour's second and final guitar solo standing alone.

Sound design 
Ezrin and Waters oversaw the capture of the album's sound effects. Waters recorded the phone call used on the original demo for "Young Lust", but neglected to inform its recipient, Mason, who assumed it was a prank call and angrily hung up. A real telephone operator was also an unwitting participant. The call references Waters' viewpoint of his bitter 1975 divorce from first wife Judy. Waters also recorded ambient sounds along Hollywood Boulevard by hanging a microphone from a studio window. Engineer Phil Taylor recorded some of the screeching tyre noises on "Run Like Hell" from a studio car park, and a television set being destroyed was used on "One of My Turns". At Britannia Row Studios, Nick Griffiths recorded the smashing of crockery for the same song. Television broadcasts were used, and one actor, recognising his voice, accepted a financial settlement from the group in lieu of legal action against them.

The maniacal schoolmaster was voiced by Waters, and actress Trudy Young supplied the groupie's voice. Backing vocals were performed by a range of artists, although a planned appearance by the Beach Boys on "The Show Must Go On" and "Waiting for the Worms" was cancelled by Waters, who instead settled for Beach Boy Bruce Johnston and Toni Tennille.

Ezrin's suggestion to release "Another Brick in the Wall, Part 2" as a single with a disco-style beat did not initially find favour with Gilmour, although Mason and Waters were more enthusiastic. Waters opposed releasing a single, but became receptive once he listened to Ezrin and Guthrie's mix. With two identical verses the song was felt to be lacking, and so a copy was sent to Griffiths in London with a request to find children to perform several versions of the lyrics. Griffiths contacted Alun Renshaw, head of music at the nearby Islington Green school, who was enthusiastic, saying: "I wanted to make music relevant to the kids – not just sitting around listening to Tchaikovsky. I thought the lyrics were great – 'We don't need no education, we don't need no thought control ...'  I just thought it would be a wonderful experience for the kids."

Griffiths first recorded small groups of pupils and then invited more, telling them to affect a Cockney accent and shout rather than sing. He multitracked the voices, making the groups sound larger, before sending his recordings back to Los Angeles. The result delighted Waters, and the song was released as a single, becoming a Christmas number one. There was some controversy when the British press reported that the children had not been paid for their efforts; they were eventually given copies of the album, and the school received a £1,000 donation (£ in contemporary value).

Artwork and packaging 
The album's cover art is one of Pink Floyd's most minimal – a white brick wall and no text. Waters had a falling out with Hipgnosis designer Storm Thorgerson a few years earlier when Thorgerson had included the cover of Animals in his book The Work of Hipgnosis: 'Walk Away René. The Wall is therefore the first album cover of the band since The Piper at the Gates of Dawn not to be created by the design group. Issues of the album would include the lettering of the artist name and album title by cartoonist Gerald Scarfe, either as a sticker on sleeve wrapping or printed onto the cover itself, in either black or red. Scarfe, who had previously created animations for the band's "In the Flesh" tour, also created the LP's inside sleeve art and labels of both vinyl records of the album, showing the eponymous wall in various stages of construction, accompanied by characters from the story. The drawings would be translated into dolls for The Wall Tour, as well as into Scarfe's animated segments shown during the tour and the film based on the album. It is notable that the stadium drawn in the inner sleeve looks a lot like the Montreal Olympic Stadium where the album's concept happens to find its origin. It seems plausible that the artist was inspired by the stadium's appearance in 1977 and its inclined tower which was completed only at a third of its projected (and present) height, reminiscent of the many "towers" pictured in the artist's stadium.

 Release and reception 

When the completed album was played for an assembled group of executives at Columbia's headquarters in California, several were reportedly unimpressed by what they heard. Matters had not been helped when Columbia Records offered Waters smaller publishing rights on the grounds that The Wall was a double album, a position he did not accept. When one executive offered to settle the dispute with a coin toss, Waters asked why he should gamble on something he owned. He eventually prevailed. The record company's concerns were alleviated when "Another Brick in the Wall Part 2" reached number one in the UK, US, Norway, Portugal, West Germany and South Africa. It was certified platinum in the UK in December 1979, and platinum in the US three months later. In Germany, the album reached the one million sales mark within three months of its release. In Canada, the album had sold 830,000 copies by January 1981.

The Wall was released in the UK and in the US on 30 November 1979. Coinciding with its release, Waters was interviewed by veteran DJ Tommy Vance, who played the album in its entirety on BBC Radio 1. Critical opinion of its content was mixed. Reviewing for Rolling Stone in February 1980, Kurt Loder hailed it as "a stunning synthesis of Waters's by now familiar thematic obsessions" that "leaps to life with a relentless lyrical rage that's clearly genuine and, in its painstaking particularity, ultimately horrifying." By contrast, The Village Voice critic Robert Christgau regarded it as "a dumb tribulations-of-a-rock-star epic" backed by "kitschy minimal maximalism with sound effects and speech fragments", adding in The New York Times that its worldview is "self-indulgent" and "presents the self-pity of its rich, famous and decidedly post-adolescent protagonist as a species of heroism". Melody Maker declared, "I'm not sure whether it's brilliant or terrible, but I find it utterly compelling."

Nevertheless, the album topped the Billboard charts for 15 weeks, selling over a million copies in its first two months of sales and in 1999 was certified 23× platinum. It remains one of the best-selling albums of all time in the US, between 1979 and 1990 selling over 19 million copies worldwide. The Wall is Pink Floyd's second-best selling album after 1973's The Dark Side of the Moon.

Engineer James Guthrie's efforts were rewarded in 1980 with a Grammy award for Best Engineered Recording (non-classical), and the album was nominated for the Grammy Award for Album of the Year. Rolling Stone placed it at number 87 on its 500 Greatest Albums of All Time list in 2003, maintaining the rating in a 2012 revised list, although this was updated to 129 with the list's 2020 revision. Based on such rankings, the aggregate website Acclaimed Music lists The Wall as the 166th most acclaimed album in history.

The Wall, said Billy Corgan at his induction of the Floyd into the Rock and Roll Hall of Fame, was "at my tender age of fourteen… too creepy, too intense, too nihilistic. And, of course, these are all the things that I believe in now… But at twenty-eight years old, it's one of the bravest records I've ever heard. And I really can't point to anything else that's ever summed up everything that's fucked up about life; everything that's fucked up about rock. It takes on politics, hero worship, rock 'n' roll, and our desires to connect with the universe, all in one fell swoop. It really, truly, is an amazing testament to how far they were willing to go to reach the outer limits of what's important."

"The Wall is stupefyingly good," Waters declared in 1992. "Christ, what a brilliant idea that was. It holds together so well… And of course Dave's musical influence on that was considerable. Despite what has happened between us since then, I still have great respect for him as a guitarist."

 Reissues 
A 1994 digitally remastered CD version manufactured in China omits "Young Lust", but retains a composition credit for Waters/Gilmour in the booklet. The album was reissued in three versions as part of the Why Pink Floyd...? campaign, which featured a massive restoration of the band's catalogue with remastering by producer James Guthrie: in 2011, a "Discovery" edition, featuring the remastered version with no extras; and in 2012, both the "Experience" edition, which adds a bonus disc of unreleased material and other supplementary items, and the "Immersion" version, a seven-disc collection that also adds video materials. The album was reissued under the Pink Floyd Records label on 26 August 2016 along with The Division Bell.

 Tour 
The Wall Tour opened at the Los Angeles Memorial Sports Arena on 7 February 1980. As the band played, a  wall of cardboard bricks was gradually built between them and the audience. Several characters were realised as giant inflatables, including a pig, replete with a crossed hammers logo. Scarfe was employed to produce a series of animations to be projected onto the wall. At his London studio, he employed a team of 40 animators to create nightmarish visions of the future, including a dove of peace, a schoolmaster, and Pink's mother.

For "Comfortably Numb", while Waters sang his opening verse, Gilmour waited in darkness at the top of the wall, standing on a flight case on casters, held steady by a technician, both precariously balanced atop a hydraulic platform. On cue, bright blue and white lights would suddenly illuminate him. At the end of the concert, the wall collapsed, revealing the band. Along with the songs on the album, the tour featured an instrumental medley, "The Last Few Bricks", played before "Goodbye Cruel World" to allow the construction crew to complete the wall.

During the tour, band relationships dropped to an all-time low; four Winnebagos were parked in a circle, with the doors facing away from the centre. Waters used his own vehicle to arrive at the venue, and stayed in separate hotels from the rest of the band. Wright, returning as a salaried musician, was the only member of the band to profit from the tour, which lost about £400,000.

 Adaptations 

A film adaptation, Pink Floyd – The Wall, was released by Metro-Goldwyn-Mayer in July 1982. It was written by Waters and directed by Alan Parker, with Bob Geldof as Pink. It used Scarfe's animation alongside actors, with little conventional dialogue. A modified soundtrack was created for some of the film's songs.

On 21 July 1990, Waters and producer Tony Hollingsworth created The Wall – Live in Berlin, staged for charity at a site once occupied by part of the Berlin Wall. In the concert, great artists of the 80's played at the concert, such as Scorpions, Cyndi Lauper, Sinéad O'Connor, Ute Lemper, Tim Curry, Van Morrison, Bryan Adams and many more artists. The concert was broadcast on television in 52 countries, and was later released as a video and album at the end of that same year, although they omitted the song "Outside the Wall" and instead played "The Tide Is Turning", a song from Roger Waters' 1987 solo album Radio K.A.O.S. In 2003, the album was remastered and for the first time, the video was released on DVD.

In 2000, Pink Floyd released Is There Anybody Out There? The Wall Live 1980–81, which contains portions of various live shows from the Wall Tour, but mainly the shows in the Earls Court in London. In 2012, it was remastered and released on The Wall "Immersion" Box-Set as an extra.

Beginning in 2010 and with dates lasting into 2013, Waters performed the album worldwide on his tour, The Wall Live. This had a much wider wall, updated higher quality projected content and leading-edge projection technology. Gilmour and Mason played at one show in London at The O2 Arena. A film of the live concert, Roger Waters: The Wall, was released in 2015.

In 2016, Waters adapted The Wall into an opera, Another Brick in the Wall: The Opera with contemporary classical composer Julien Bilodeau. It premiered at Opéra de Montréal in March 2017, and was produced by Cincinnati Opera in July 2018. It is orchestrated for a score of eight soloists, 48 chorus members, and a standard 70-piece operatic orchestra.

In 2018, a tribute album The Wall [Redux] was released, with individual artists covering the entire album. This included Melvins' version of "In The Flesh?", Pallbearer covering "Run Like Hell", former Screaming Trees' singer Mark Lanegan covering "Nobody Home" and Church of the Cosmic Skull reworking "The Trial".

On September 19, 2019, Channel Awesome's internet series, Nostalgia Critic released a music video review of the album called Nostalgia Critic's The Wall, featuring Corey Taylor and Rob Scallon. The album and video received overwhelmingly poor reviews from viewers and critics.

 Track listing 
All tracks written by Roger Waters, except where noted.

 Personnel Pink Floyd Roger Waters – vocals, bass guitar (1-5, 8, 10, 12, 13, 15, 19, 21), synthesizer (1, 7, 8, 11, 16, 21, 23), acoustic guitar (6, 17), electric guitar (12), sleeve design, co-production
 David Gilmour – vocals, electric and acoustic guitars, bass guitar (6, 7, 9, 11, 14, 16, 17, 19, 20, 22, 23, 25), synthesizer (2, 7, 8, 19, 21, 23), co-production
 Nick Mason – drums and percussion (except 3, 6–8, 13, 16, 17, 24, 26)
 Richard Wright – keyboards, Hammond organ (except 6, 18, 21, 24, 26)Additional musiciansProduction Charts 

 Weekly charts 

 Year-end charts SinglesCertifications and sales

 See also 
 List of best-selling albums
 List of best-selling albums in Australia
 List of best-selling albums in Canada
 List of best-selling albums in France
 List of best-selling albums in Germany
 List of best-selling albums in New Zealand
 List of best-selling albums in the United States
 List of diamond-certified albums in Canada

 References NotesFootnotesBibliography 
 
 
 
 
 
 
 Further reading'

External links 
 
 

 
1979 albums
Albums produced by Roger Waters
Albums produced by James Guthrie (record producer)
Albums produced by Bob Ezrin
Albums produced by David Gilmour
Anti-fascist music
Capitol Records albums
Columbia Records albums
Concept albums
EMI Records albums
Harvest Records albums
Pink Floyd albums
Art rock albums by English artists
Rock operas
Mental health in fiction
Fiction with unreliable narrators
Albums recorded at CBS 30th Street Studio
Progressive pop albums
Albums recorded at Studio Miraval
Juno Award for International Album of the Year albums
Grammy Award for Best Engineered Album, Non-Classical